Mansilla de la Sierra is a village in the province and autonomous community of La Rioja, Spain.

The village was the model for the town described by Ana María Matute in her collection of stories Historias de la Artámila.

Demographics

Population centres
 Mansilla de la Sierra
 Tabladas

References

Populated places in La Rioja (Spain)